Lassandro is a surname. Notable people with the surname include: 

Damiano Lassandro (born 1947), Italian boxer
Florence Lassandro (1900–1923), Italian-Canadian bootlegger